Sharon Elizabeth Lawrence (born June 29, 1961)is an American actress. From 1993 to 1999, she starred as Sylvia Costas in the ABC drama series, NYPD Blue. The role garnered her three Primetime Emmy Award nominations for Outstanding Supporting Actress in a Drama Series, Screen Actors Guild Award for Outstanding Performance by a Female Actor in a Drama Series, and Satellite Award for Best Actress – Television Series Drama. She received three additional Emmy Awards nominations for her later television performances. 

After her NYPD Blue breakthrough, Lawrence starred in the sitcoms Fired Up (1997-98) and Ladies Man (1999-2001). she starred in the CBS supernatural drama Wolf Lake in 2001, and the CW teen drama Hidden Palms in 2007. Lawrence had notable recurring performances in Desperate Housewives, Drop Dead Diva, Rizzoli & Isles, The Ranch, Shameless and Queen Sugar. Her film credits include Gossip (2000), Middle of Nowhere (2012) and Solace (2015). In 2021, she began starring in the Paramount+ neo-Western series, Joe Pickett.

Early life and education
Lawrence was born in Charlotte, North Carolina. She moved from Charlotte to Raleigh in her junior year of high school and graduated from Needham B. Broughton High School. She attended the University of North Carolina at Chapel Hill and graduated with a Bachelor of Arts degree in journalism in 1983.

Career
Lawrence began her acting career on Broadway in the 1987 revival of Cabaret. In 1990, she performed in Fiddler on the Roof. She appeared in a number of television movies and series in the 1990s, like Cheers and Star Trek: Voyager. In 1993 she was cast as Assistant District Attorney Sylvia Costas in the ABC police drama series NYPD Blue created by Steven Bochco. Her consistently praised performance earned the actress three Primetime Emmy Award for Outstanding Supporting Actress in a Drama Series nominations from 1993 to 1996, and the Screen Actors Guild Award for Outstanding Performance by a Female Actor in a Drama Series in 1996. In 1996 she left the show for her own comedy series Fired Up on NBC. The series was canceled after two seasons. She later returned to NYPD Blue as a regular, and left the show in 1999, after her character was killed.

Lawrence starred with Betty White and Alfred Molina on the short-lived sitcom Ladies Man from 1999 to 2001. She played Velma Kelly in the Broadway musical Chicago in 2000. She also had a series regular role on the CBS supernatural drama Wolf Lake from 2001 to 2002. In film, she co-starred in Gossip (2000), Little Black Book (2004), and The Alibi (2006).
 
Lawrence guest starred on many television dramas and sitcoms in the 2000s. She played Maisy Gibbons, a housewife/prostitute in season one of Desperate Housewives. She also appeared in Law & Order: Special Victims Unit, Boston Legal, Monk, Curb Your Enthusiasm, The Mentalist, and Body of Proof. She starred in TV movie Atomic Twister as Corrine McGuire. She had a regular role on the short-lived CW teenage drama series Hidden Palms (2008), as Tess Wiatt, and was seen in the Canadian cable television drama The Line in 2009.

In 2009, Lawrence was nominated for the Emmy Award for Outstanding Guest Actress in a Drama Series for her portrayal as Izzie Stevens' mother on Grey's Anatomy. In April 2010, Lawrence joined Josh Schwartz's CBS pilot Hitched. In October 2010, she began a recurring role on One Tree Hill as Sylvia Baker, the mother of Julian Baker (Austin Nichols) who comes to Tree Hill from Los Angeles to plan the upcoming wedding of Julian and Brooke Davis (Sophia Bush). She also played the lead character mother in a Lifetime comedy-drama Drop Dead Diva from 2009 to 2013. Also, she played the birth mother of Dr. Maura Isles (Sasha Alexander) in the TNT television series Rizzoli & Isles, although in real life the actresses are only 12 years apart. In recent years, Lawrence has starred in several independent films. In 2013 she was cast in Chris Carter's thriller drama series The After. The show was set to premiere on Amazon Studios in 2014. Amazon canceled the series before its premiere on January 5, 2015. In March 2015, Lawrence was cast in the ABC comedy-drama pilot Mix.

In 2017, Lawrence starred in the CBS short-lived comedy series Me, Myself and I. The show premiered September 25 but aired only six episodes before the network pulled it from the schedule due to low ratings. Also in 2017, she had a recurring role as Dawn-Lyen Gardner's character mother in the Oprah Winfrey Network drama series Queen Sugar and co-starred opposite Sam Elliott in the second season of Netflix comedy The Ranch. From 2016 to 2019 she had a recurring role as a real estate mogul Margo Mierzejewski in the Showtime comedy-drama series Shameless. Lawrence later had a recurring role as Laura Van Kirk on The CW prime time soap opera Dynasty starting in 2018, and as Louise Garbeau on the Showtime comedy series On Becoming a God in Central Florida in 2019.

In 2021, Lawrence had a recurring roles in Punky Brewster and Rebel. She later began starring the Paramount+ neo-Western series, Joe Pickett.

Personal life
In 2002, Lawrence married Dr. Tom Apostle. Their wedding was held at the Greek Orthodox church Saint Sophia, the same Los Angeles church in which her character, Sylvia Costas, in NYPD Blue married Detective Andy Sipowicz. Lawrence has played on the World Poker Tour in the Hollywood Home and performed in benefits for the Alzheimer's Association in Los Angeles called Night at Sardi's and the What A Pair show for the John Wayne Breast Cancer Center.

Lawrence chairs the Women In Film Foundation, the philanthropic arm of Women In Film, which since 1973 has advanced professional opportunities for women in the global entertainment marketplace. She supports Global Green and World Wildlife Fund to protect the environment and endangered species. She is an avid scuba diver.

Filmography

Film

Television

Awards and nominations

References

External links
 
 
 

1961 births
Living people
Actresses from North Carolina
Actresses from Charlotte, North Carolina
UNC Hussman School of Journalism and Media alumni
American television actresses
American stage actresses
American film actresses
20th-century American actresses
21st-century American actresses
Needham B. Broughton High School alumni